The Pungo River Formation is a geologic formation in North Carolina. It preserves fossils dating back to the Middle Miocene.

Economic significance

The Pungo River Formation is mined extensively for its phosphorite deposits.

See also

 List of fossiliferous stratigraphic units in North Carolina

References
 
 

Neogene geology of North Carolina